Kümmel means "caraway" in German. It may refer to:

Surname
Kümmel is a German surname. Notable people with the surname include:
 Ernst Kümmel (born 1925), former German and later East German football player and manager
 Ina Kümmel (born 1967), German cross country skier
 Johannes Kümmel (1909–1944), German military officer
 Peeter Kümmel (born 1982), Estonian cross-country skier

Other
Kümmel (liqueur)
Kümmel's disease